Vexillum (Vexillum) vulpecula, common name : the Little Fox Mitre,  is a species of small sea snail, marine gastropod mollusk in the family Costellariidae, the ribbed miters.

Description
The shell size varies between 27 mm and 72 mm

Distribution
This species is distributed in the Indo-West Pacific along Madagascar and Mozambique and in the Pacific Ocean along Australia, the Philippines, Fiji and Okinawa.

References

 Dautzenberg, Ph. (1929). Mollusques testacés marins de Madagascar. Faune des Colonies Francaises, Tome III
 Turner H. 2001. Katalog der Familie Costellariidae Macdonald, 1860. Conchbooks. 1-100 page(s): 68

External links
  Cernohorsky, Walter Oliver. The Mitridae of Fiji; The veliger vol. 8 (1965)

vulpecula
Gastropods described in 1758
Taxa named by Carl Linnaeus